Nicolas Dehon (born 2 April 1968) is a French retired professional footballer who played as a goalkeeper for Troyes. He is the goalkeeping coach at Nice.

Career
Dehon spent his entire playing career as a backup goalkeeper for Troyes, having been with the club for 14 years as they climbed from the French 7th division to the Ligue 1. After retiring as a player, he as worked as a goalkeeper coach with Troyes, Le Havre, PSG, Marseille, Amiens, and most recently Nice.

References

External links
 
 Nice Profile

1968 births
Living people
People from Maubeuge
French footballers
Association football goalkeepers
Ligue 1 players
Ligue 2 players
Championnat National players
Championnat National 2 players
RC Lens players
INF Vichy players
Paris Saint-Germain F.C. non-playing staff
Association football goalkeeping coaches
ES Troyes AC players
OGC Nice non-playing staff
Le Havre AC non-playing staff
Sportspeople from Nord (French department)
Footballers from Hauts-de-France